Edward Searing (July 14, 1835 – October 22, 1898) was an American educator.

Born in Aurora, New York, in Cayuga County, New York, Searing received his bachelor's and master's degree from the University of Michigan. In 1857, he moved to Wisconsin and taught school. Searing then moved to Milton, Wisconsin in 1863 and became a professor at Milton College. Searing was elected Superintendent of Public Instruction of Wisconsin and served 1874-1878. In 1880. Searing moved to Mankato, Minnesota and became the first President of the Mankato Normal School now Minnesota State University, Mankato. Searing died in Saint Paul, Minnesota, on October 22, 1898, while at a normal school board meeting.

Notes

1835 births
1898 deaths
People from Aurora, Cayuga County, New York
People from Milton, Wisconsin
People from Mankato, Minnesota
University of Michigan alumni
Superintendents of Public Instruction of Wisconsin
Presidents of Minnesota State University, Mankato
Milton College faculty
19th-century American politicians